The 1999–2000 season was the 17th season in the existence of Getafe CF and the club's first season back in the second division of Spanish football. The season covered the period from 1 July 1999 to 30 June 2000.

Competitions

Overall record

Segunda División

League table

Results summary

Results by round

Matches

Source:

Copa del Rey

Preliminary round

First round

References

Getafe CF seasons
Getafe